Lord Kennedy is a title in the peerage of Scotland held by the Marquess of Ailsa.

Lord Kennedy may also refer to:

 Neil Kennedy, Lord Kennedy (1854–1918), Scottish academic and judge
 Roy Kennedy, Baron Kennedy of Southwark (born 1962), British Labour politician

See also 
 Baroness Kennedy (disambiguation)